Moon of the Blood Beast is a 2019 American horror film directed and written by Dustin Ferguson. It stars D.T. Carney and Vida Ghaffari.

The film premiered on After Hours Cinema on WGUD-TV 51.

Plot 
An infamous, mythical blood beast strikes terror in a small coastal town. This vicious blood beast returns every time there is a cycle of the Harvest Moon to get sacrifices in exchange for protecting the residents of this secluded town.

Cast 
 D.T. Carney as Frank
 Vida Ghaffari as Noel Johnson
 Mike Ferguson as Gabe Smith
 Dawna Lee Heising as Bernadette
 Alan Maxson as Blood Beast

Awards 
 Vida Ghaffari - Best Actress, Supernatural Thriller at the Los Angeles Nollywood Film Awards, 2019
 Dustin Ferguson - Best Director, Supernatural Thriller at the Los Angeles Nollywood Film Awards, 2019

References

External links 
 

2019 films
American horror thriller films
2010s English-language films
2010s American films